Paris Alexandria Jones is a singer and songwriter from Greensboro, North Carolina. Jones began her career as a songwriter, signed to Artist Publishing Group, and has written for Wiz Khalifa, Usher, Chris Brown, Charlie Puth and Fantasia Barrino. She categorizes her sound as "Come Up Music", and doesn't hold herself to one specific genre.

PJ released her Atlantic Records five-song debut EP, Walking Around Pools, in March 2015. On July 15, 2016, she released her debut album, Rare, which has features from G-Eazy and Ty Dolla Sign. in 2019 she released her debut single "One Missed Call".

Tours

PJ took Rare on the road, opening for K.Michelle in support of her third album, More Issues Than Vogue.

Supporting:
 Hello Kimberly Tour

Discography

Walking Around Pools EP
PJ's debut EP was released on March 10, 2015. Music videos for "I Mean It" were released in support of the EP.

Rare
PJ's debut, full-length LP was released on July 15, 2016.  "Gangster" was chosen as the first single from the album, and the video was released in April 2016. Videos for "Tell Me (Featuring Jevon Doe)" and "This Is What It Looks Like" were also released.

Waiting for Paris 
PJ's second EP was released on May 29, 2020.

Guest appearances

Writing discography

References

External links
Artist Publishing Group Artist Publishing Group / PJ
iTunes PJ Walking Around Pools – EP R&B/Soul March 10, 2015

Living people
Musicians from Los Angeles
Atlantic Records artists
21st-century American women musicians
Year of birth missing (living people)